The Tour de Hokkaido is an annual professional road bicycle racing stage race held in Hokkaido, Japan since 1987 as part of the UCI Asia Tour. It is rated by the International Cycling Union (UCI) as a 2.2 category race.

The event for 2018 was canceled due to the earthquake which occurred the day before the race.  In 2020 and 2021, the race was canceled due to COVID-19 pandemic.

Past winners

General classification

External links
 
 
 Statistics at the-sports.org
 Tour de Hokkaido at cqranking.com

Cycle races in Japan
UCI Asia Tour races
Recurring sporting events established in 1987
1987 establishments in Japan